Roger E. Régimbal (October 5, 1921 – September 29, 2000) was a Canadian politician.

Born in Sudbury, Ontario, he ran unsuccessfully for the House of Commons of Canada as the Progressive Conservative candidate in the Quebec riding of Argenteuil—Deux-Montagnes in the 1963 federal election. He was elected in the 1965 federal election. He was defeated in the 1968 election and in the 1974 election.

In 1981, he was appointed chairman of Ontario's Council of Franco-Ontarian Affairs by the Premier of Ontario William Davis. In 1984, he was appointed to Ontario's Workers' Compensation Board. He retired in 1988.

References

External links
 

1921 births
2000 deaths
Members of the House of Commons of Canada from Quebec
Progressive Conservative Party of Canada MPs
Politicians from Greater Sudbury
Franco-Ontarian people